Aprax (also known as Abracius) is a saint of the Coptic Church.

He was a native of Upper Egypt and became an anchorite for 70 years.

His feast day is celebrated on December 9.

References

Sources
Holweck, F. G. A Biographical Dictionary of the Saints. St. Louis, MO: B. Herder Book Co. 1924.

Christian saints in unknown century
Year of birth missing
Year of death missing
Coptic Orthodox saints